Filippo Dal Moro (born 11 August 1970 in Treviso) is a retired Italian professional football player.

He played 2 seasons in the Serie A for A.S. Roma (12 games). He also played for Roma in the UEFA Cup in the 1998/99 season.

1970 births
Living people
Italian footballers
Italian expatriate footballers
Serie A players
Serie B players
U.C. Sampdoria players
U.S. Pistoiese 1921 players
Udinese Calcio players
A.S.D. Giarre Calcio 1946 players
Venezia F.C. players
Empoli F.C. players
A.S. Roma players
Ternana Calcio players
Ravenna F.C. players
Novara F.C. players
AEK Athens F.C. players
Expatriate footballers in Greece
Association football defenders